Sarzyna is a village in the administrative district of Gmina Nowa Sarzyna, within Leżajsk County, Subcarpathian Voivodeship, in south-eastern Poland.

The village has a population of 3,837.

The purported hometown of Andrew Szych prior to relocation to Hatfield, Massachusetts USA
Married to Magdalena Gancarz in Hadley,MA September 8, 1915.
Died in Hatfield Dec. 1933. Father of 10.

References

Sarzyna